The white-browed ground tyrant (Muscisaxicola albilora) is a species of bird in the family Tyrannidae.
It breeds in the Andes in Argentina and Chile between 1,500 and 4,000 m above sea-level. It migrates north to Bolivia, Colombia, Ecuador and Peru. It is a vagrant to the Falkland Islands. Its natural habitat is subtropical or tropical high-altitude grassland.

References

white-browed ground tyrant
Birds of the Southern Andes
white-browed ground tyrant
Taxonomy articles created by Polbot